"Eppie Morrie" is one of the Child Ballads (No. 223), and is of Scottish origin. The author and date are unknown, and as is common with ballads of this type and period, several versions exist. It was printed in James Maidment's anthology A North Country Garland in 1824. That version is reprinted in James Kinsley's The Oxford Book of Ballads, 1969. Although the lyrics were transcribed by Francis James Child, it is uncertain if the original melody has been retained. The earliest recordings are from the performances of Jimmy MacBeath in 1951 and later Ewan MacColl; a more recent version by Andrew Calhoun forms part of his border folk song anthology Telfer's Cows.

The ballad describes a young woman being forcefully taken from her home by a man named Willie and his companions. Willie's goal is to force Eppie to marry him. She refuses, in some versions because she already has a suitor, and in others because she considers Willie to be unworthy of her. First, Willie takes her to a priest, whom he tries to force at gunpoint to perform the marriage ceremony. When the priest refuses, Eppie is locked in a room with Willie, where he tries to rape her. After a prolonged struggle, Willie finally gives up. Eppie, having retained her virginity and avoided the forced marriage, is rescued by the arrival of a band of armed men, led by John Forsyth. After being rescued, Eppie triumphantly asks Willie to provide her with a horse to return home on. Place names mentioned suggest that the events happened in Aberdeenshire.

Lyrics of the ballad
The following is the version of the lyrics of "Eppie Morrie", as related by Francis James Child (Version A):

Recordings
A list of recordings is to be found here: Child Ballad Database

References
Child, F. J., comp.; Sargent, H. C. & Kittredge, G. L., eds. (1904) The English and Scottish Popular Ballads. Boston, Mass: Houghton Mifflin

Child Ballads
Works about marriage
Scottish songs